American Relief Administration (ARA) was an American relief mission to Europe and later post-revolutionary Russia after World War I. Herbert Hoover, future president of the United States, was the program director.

The ARA's immediate predecessor was the important United States Food Administration, also headed by Hoover. He and some of his collaborators had already gained useful experience by running the Commission for Relief in Belgium which fed seven million Belgians and two million northern French during World War I.

ARA was formed by United States Congress on February 24, 1919, with a budget of 100 million dollars ($ in ). Its budget was boosted by private donations, which resulted in another 100 million dollars. In the immediate aftermath of the war, the ARA delivered more than four million tons of relief supplies to 23 war-torn European countries. Between 1919 and 1921, Arthur Cuming Ringland was chief of mission in Europe. ARA ended its operations outside Russia in 1922; it operated in Russia until 1923.

American relief and Poland
About 20% of the organization's resources were directed to the newly established Second Polish Republic. Much of its resources were helping Polish children, who expressed their appreciation by sending illustrated letters to Hoover. ARA however has been criticized by Russian sympathizers for aiding Polish soldiers amidst the Soviet invasion of Poland. Polish leader Józef Piłsudski has written a note of personal thanks to Hoover; one of the streets in Warsaw has been named after him; he also received honorary degrees from the Jagiellonian University, Warsaw University and Lwów University, among other honors (such as several honorary citizenships of various Polish towns). A monument dedicated to American helpers has been constructed in Warsaw.

Colonel Alvin B. Barber headed the group from 1919 to 1922. Specific areas had directors as well, such as William N. Haskell, who was Director of the ARA in Romania as of 1919.

American relief and Russian famine of 1921 

Under Herbert Hoover, very large scale food relief was distributed to Europe after the war through the American Relief Administration. In 1921, to ease the devastating famine in the Russian SFSR that was triggered by the Soviet government's war communism policies, the ARA's director in Europe, Walter Lyman Brown, began negotiating with the Russian People's Commissar for Foreign Affairs, Maxim Litvinov, in Riga, Latvia (at that time not yet annexed by the USSR). An agreement was reached on August 21, 1921, and an additional implementation agreement was signed by Brown and People's Commissar for Foreign Trade Leonid Krasin on December 30, 1921. The U.S. Congress appropriated $20,000,000 for relief under the Russian Famine Relief Act of late 1921. Hoover strongly detested Bolshevism, and felt the American aid would demonstrate the superiority of Western capitalism and thus help contain the spread of communism.

At its peak, the ARA employed 300 Americans, more than 120,000 Russians and fed 10.5 million people daily. Its Russian operations were headed by Col. William N. Haskell. The Medical Division of the ARA functioned from November 1921 to June 1923 and helped overcome the typhus epidemic then ravaging Russia. The ARA's famine relief operations ran in parallel with much smaller Mennonite, Jewish and Quaker famine relief operations in Russia.
	

The ARA's operations in Russia were shut down on June 15, 1923, after it was discovered that Russia under Lenin renewed the export of grain.

See also 
 Foreign policy of Herbert Hoover
 American Committee for Relief in the Near East
 The President's Economic Mission to Germany and Austria
 Hoover Institution Library and Archives
 GARIOA
 UNRRA
 Marshall Plan

People
 James Stuart McKnight, worked with the agency

Notes

Further reading

 Bruno Cabanes. "The hungry and the sick: Herbert Hoover, the Russian famine, and the professionalization of humanitarian aid" in Bruno Cabanes, The Great War and the Origins of Humanitarianism, 1918-1924 (Cambridge UP, 2014) 189–247. 
 A.C. Freeman, "Is Hoover Bringing Russia Food or Reaction?" New York Call Magazine, Aug 7, 1921, pp. 1, 11.
 H.H. Fisher, The Famine in Soviet Russia, 1919–1923: The Operations of the American Relief Administration. New York: Macmillan, 1927.
 Frank Golder, War, Revolution, and Peace in Russia: The Passages of Frank Golder, 1914–1927. Terence Emmons and Bertrand M. Patenaude (eds.). Stanford, CA: Hoover Institution Press, 1992.
George H. Nash. The Life of Herbert Hoover: The Humanitarian, 1914–1917 (1988) 
 Nash, George H. "An American Epic’: Herbert Hoover and Belgian Relief in World War I." Prologue  21 (1989). online
 Bertrand M. Patenaude. The Big Show in Bololand. Stanford, CA: Stanford University Press, 2002.
 Bertrand M. Patenaude, "A Race against Anarchy: Even after the Great War ended, famine and chaos threatened Europe. Herbert Hoover rescued the continent, reviving trade, rebuilding infrastructure, and restoring economic order, holding a budding Bolshevism in check." Hoover Digest 2 (2020): 183-200 online
 NN,  "Vastness of Hoover’s Work Realized as He Returns," The New York Times, September 14, 1919, pg. 47.
 NN, "Bankers to Handle 'Food Draft' Sales," New York Times, January 22, 1920, pg. 27.
 NN, "$8,000,000 Distributed In Food Drafts for Germany," New York Times, September 7, 1920, pg. 1.
 Frank M. Surface and Raymond L. Bland, American Food in the World War and Reconstruction Period. Operations of the Organizations Under the Direction of Herbert Hoover 1914 to 1924, Stanford, CA: Stanford UP, 1931.   online; 1034 detailed pages
 
 Усманов Н.В. Деятельность Американской администрации помощи в Башкирии во время голода 1921—1923 гг. Бирск, 2004; 

 
1919 establishments in the United States
1923 disestablishments in the United States
Aftermath of World War I in Poland
Aftermath of World War I in Russia and in the Soviet Union
Organizations established in 1919
Organizations disestablished in 1923
Herbert Hoover
Humanitarian aid organizations of World War I
Philanthropic organizations based in the United States
United States–European relations
Soviet Union–United States relations